The 1840 United States presidential election in Maryland took place between October 30 and December 2, 1840, as part of the 1840 United States presidential election. Voters chose 10 representatives, or electors to the Electoral College, who voted for President and Vice President.

Maryland voted for the Whig candidate, William Henry Harrison, over Democratic candidate Martin Van Buren, by a margin of 7.66%. As of 2020, this remains the only time in history that an incumbent Democratic president who served a full term has failed to carry any of Maryland’s electoral votes in a reelection bid.

This was the first Presidential election that Carroll County was able to vote in.

Results

Results by county

Counties that flipped from Democratic to Whig
Cecil

See also
 United States presidential elections in Maryland
 1840 United States presidential election
 1840 United States elections

Notes

References 

Maryland
1840
Presidential